The No. 14 chair is the most famous chair made by the Thonet chair company. Also known as the 'bistro chair', it was designed by Michael Thonet and introduced in 1859, becoming the world's first mass-produced item of furniture. It is made using bent wood (steam-bending), and the design required years to perfect. With its affordable price and simple design, it became one of the best-selling chairs ever made. Some 50 million No. 14s were sold between 1859 and 1930, and millions more have been sold since.

Thonet's No. 14 was made of six pieces of steam-bent wood, ten screws, and two nuts. The chairs could be mass-produced by unskilled workers and disassembled to save space during transportation. 

Later chairs, as illustrated here, were made of eight pieces of wood: two diagonal braces were added between the seat and back, to strengthen this hard-worked joint.

The design was a response to a requirement for cafe-style chairs. The seat was often made of woven cane or palm, because the holes in the seat would let spilt liquid drain off the chair.

Chair No 14 is still produced by Gebrüder Thonet Vienna. Ton, and by Thonet (as 214).

Design classic
The No. 14 chair is widely regarded as a design classic. It earned a gold medal when it was shown at the 1867 World Exposition in Paris. It has been praised by many designers and architects, including Le Corbusier, who said "Never was a better and more elegant design and a more precisely crafted and practical item created."

Redesign 

As the original design is now in the public domain, there have been many new versions. In 1961, a plastic version was made by IKEA. In 2009, the chair was redesigned by James Irvine, an English designer, and retailed from Muji, a Japanese company. Roland Ohnacker, managing director of Thonet, stated that the aim was "to help 18 to 35 year-olds enter the Thonet brand world."

References

Chairs
Individual models of furniture
Flatpack furniture